Admiral Joseph Peyton (1725–1804) was a Royal Navy officer who became commander-in-chief of the Mediterranean Fleet.

Naval career
Peyton joined the Royal Navy on 4 June 1743. Promoted to commander in March 1756, he took command of the sloop HMS Savage in 1756 and the second-rate HMS Prince George in 1757. Promoted to captain in December 1757, he went on to command the second rate HMS Prince in 1759 and saw action at the Battle of Lagos in August 1759 during the Seven Years' War.

Peyton went on to command the fifth-rate HMS Minerva in 1762, the third-rate HMS Belleisle in 1766 and the third-rate HMS Cumberland in 1777. In HMS Cumberland he saw action at the Battle of Ushant in July 1778 and at the first Battle of Cape St Vincent in 1780, during the Anglo-French War. He became commander-in-chief of the Mediterranean Fleet in 1789 and commander-in-chief of the Downs in 1794.

References

|-

Royal Navy admirals
1725 births
1804 deaths